Nefesch (born 12 May 1983) is a mentalist, hypnotist and writer from El Salvador. He is known for his performances on many television shows including The Successor of Uri Geller in Greece in 2009 and La Grande Magia – The Illusionist in Italy in 2013.
Nefesch is also an instructor of the Mentalism School in Phoenix Arizona in USA.

His artistic name Nefesch is a Hebrew word (נפש), which means "soul".

Early life and career
Nefesch grew up in San Salvador, El Salvador, in a very religious family who did not approve of theatrical magic, mentalism or hypnosis. He and his family belonged to the Jehovahs Witnesses and his father was a priest, so he learned these arts in secret from his parents,

In his early adult years, he decided to perform professionally despite of his family's disapproval. His family cut all ties and him and, in 2008, he was accused of practicing magic and disfellowshipped (excommunicated) from the Jehovah's Witnesses Association worldwide, despite his efforts to prove that his performances were nothing but innocent sleight of hand and psychological trickery.

With the through the years, Nefesch has performed in more than 20 countries and shared some of his unique ideas and developed techniques in the arts of mentalism, with some of the top mentalists and psychic performers such as Richard Osterlind, Banachek and Keith Barry.

References

External links
 Mentalism School

Mentalists
1983 births
Living people